Snelling (formerly Snelling's Ranch) is an unincorporated community and census-designated place (CDP) in Merced County, California, United States. The population was 238 at the 2020 census.

History
The "Snelling Ranch" post office opened in 1853, was closed for a time during 1861, and changed its name to "Snelling" in 1870. The name is from the Snelling family that operated a way station at the place beginning in 1851.

Snelling's zip code is 95369 and its area code is 209.

Snelling was the county seat of Merced County from 1857 to 1872. The courthouse constructed in 1857 continued to serve as a justice court until the 1990s. The two-story building remains standing today and is a rare surviving example of a simple early California courthouse.

Geography
Snelling is in northeastern Merced County along the eastern edge of California's Central Valley, where the Merced River emerges from the foothills of the Sierra Nevada. It is at the north end of California State Route 59, which leads south to Merced, the county seat.

Demographics
The 2010 United States Census reported that Snelling had a population of 231. The racial makeup of Snelling was 206 (89.2%) White, 0 (0.0%) African American, 3 (1.3%) Native American, 6 (2.6%) Asian, 0 (0.0%) Pacific Islander, 13 (5.6%) from other races, and 3 (1.3%) from two or more races. Hispanic or Latino of any race were 33 persons (14.3%).

The Census reported that 231 people (100% of the population) lived in households, 0 (0%) lived in non-institutionalized group quarters, and 0 (0%) were institutionalized.

There were 94 households, out of which 31 (33.0%) had children under the age of 18 living in them, 37 (39.4%) were opposite-sex married couples living together, 18 (19.1%) had a female householder with no husband present, 3 (3.2%) had a male householder with no wife present.  There were 8 (8.5%) unmarried opposite-sex partnerships, and 1 (1.1%) same-sex married couples or partnerships. 30 households (31.9%) were made up of individuals, and 12 (12.8%) had someone living alone who was 65 years of age or older. The average household size was 2.46.  There were 58 families (61.7% of all households); the average family size was 3.02.

The population was spread out, with 61 people (26.4%) under the age of 18, 13 people (5.6%) aged 18 to 24, 51 people (22.1%) aged 25 to 44, 71 people (30.7%) aged 45 to 64, and 35 people (15.2%) who were 65 years of age or older.  The median age was 40.3 years. For every 100 females, there were 110.0 males.  For every 100 females age 18 and over, there were 112.5 males.

The homeowner vacancy rate was 3.9%; the rental vacancy rate was 6.1%.  113 people (48.9% of the population) lived in owner-occupied housing units and 118 people (51.1%) lived in rental housing units.

Government

California Historical Landmark
Snelling Courthouse is a California Historical Landmarks, number 409.

The California Historical Landmark reads:
NO. 409 SNELLING COURTHOUSE - This, the first courthouse in Merced County, was erected in 1857. This monument commemorates the 75th anniversary of the organization of Merced County and is dedicated to the memory of our pioneers by Yosemite Parlor No. 24, N.S.G.W., Merced, May 20, 1930.

See also

California Historical Landmarks in Merced County
History of California through 1899

References

Census-designated places in Merced County, California
Former county seats in California
Census-designated places in California
1853 establishments in California